High Wheeldon is a distinctive dome-shaped hill near the Staffordshire border in Hartington Middle Quarter civil parish, Derbyshire, in the Peak District valley of Upper Dovedale, overlooking the villages of Earl Sterndale, Longnor and Crowdecote. It is close to the more distinctive and more widely known Chrome Hill and Parkhouse Hill. Popular with walkers, and possessing excellent views of the Dove and Manifold valleys, High Wheeldon is in the care of the National Trust, and has been since 1946 when it was presented by Mr F.A. Holmes of Buxton to the Trust as a war memorial. A plaque at the summit commemorates the presentation, stating that the hill was presented 'in honoured memory of the men of Derbyshire and Staffordshire who fell in the Second World War'.

Slightly below the summit of the hill is a rock shelter called Fox Hole Cave, which is closed by an iron gate as it has archaeological significance. Items, including Peterborough ware, early Bronze Age pottery, a stone axe, flint microliths and animal bones, have been found in the cave, which is believed to have been used from the Upper Paleolithic. The cave is a scheduled monument.

References

Mountains and hills of the Peak District
Mountains and hills of Derbyshire